Perotis unicolor, common name green jewel beetle,  is a species of beetles belonging to the Buprestidae family.

Distribution
This species is present in France, Italy, Spain, Portugal and in North Africa.

Subspecies
 Perotis unicolor igniventris Escalera, 1914
 Perotis unicolor unicolor (Olivier, 1790)

References
 Fauna Europaea
 Biolib
 Genus Perotis
 Zipcodezoo Species identifier

External links
 Perotis unicolor

Buprestidae
Beetles described in 1790